Montbazon is a commune in the Indre-et-Loire department, France. It is located on the river Indre between the towns of Veigné, Monts and Sorigny. The town is about 12 km from Tours.

History
In 991, friars of Cormery complained to the king that Fulk Nerra, lord of Anjou, was building a fortress in their land of Montbazon (he became lord of Montbazon in 997 although he was 17 years old).

From 994, the lofty fortress dominated a strategic point on the Indre river.

Population

Economy
Montbazon has a small industrial park. It groups together small and medium-sized businesses.

Education
There are four schools in the town:
 Jean Le Bourg kindergarten
 Guillaume Louis Primary School
 Albert Camus High School
 Saint Gatien Private High School

Transportation
There are two bus lines (G and H) which cross the town. Four bus stops are located at:
 City Center
 Albert Camus High School
 La Courtille
 La Grange Barbier

Media
The town launched an online radio station in 2010.

Sights

The fortress of Montbazon built by Fulk Nerra is one of the oldest fortress in France.
Le Château d'Artigny
Parcours botanique au fil de l'Indre

See also
Communes of the Indre-et-Loire department
Duchy of Montbazon

References

Communes of Indre-et-Loire